Bhador is a village in Guna district of Madhya Pradesh in India.

References

Villages in Guna district